Ardendrain (Scottish Gaelic: Àirde an Droigheann, meaning "Height of the Blackthorn) is a scattered hamlet in the Highland council area of Scotland. It is 2.5 miles (4 km) south of the village of Kiltarlity, and 11 miles (18 km) west of Inverness.

The hamlet is spread over the grassy fields of Glen Convinth, with both the A833 and Belladrum Burn running directly through it. Kiltarlity Lodges, a group of four-star, self-catering cabins, is located within the hamlet.

References

Populated places in Inverness committee area